Ratold, also spelled Rathold, Radolt, Ratolt or Ratoldus, is a masculine given name of Germanic origin. It is a variant of Rapoto. In Italian it is Ratoldo. It may refer to:
Ratold (bishop of Verona) (c. 770–840/58)
Ratold (bishop of Strasbourg) (fl. 874)
Ratold of Italy (fl. 896), king
Ratold of Aibling (10th century) hermit
Ratold of Corbie (abbot, 986–1014)

Radolt, as a surname, may refer to:
Wenzel Ludwig von Radolt (1667–1716), Austrian musician and composer

See also
Rátót (genus), a Hungarian family